Douglas Henry Soetaert (born April 21, 1955) is a Canadian former professional ice hockey goaltender. He was selected by the New York Rangers in the second round (30th overall) of the 1975 NHL Amateur Draft. He played 12 seasons in the National Hockey League with the Rangers, Winnipeg Jets, and Montreal Canadiens. After his playing career, he took on hockey executive roles with Kansas City Blades, Everett Silvertips, and Omaha Ak-Sar-Ben Knights. In the 2016–17 season he was general manager of the Tucson Roadrunners in the American Hockey League.

Career statistics

Regular season and playoffs

International

Awards and achievements
1986 Stanley Cup Championship (Montreal)

References

External links

Profile at hockeydraftcentral.com

1955 births
Living people
Arizona Coyotes scouts
Calgary Flames executives
Canadian ice hockey goaltenders
Edmonton Oil Kings (WCHL) players
Montreal Canadiens players
New Haven Nighthawks players
New York Rangers draft picks
New York Rangers players
New York Rangers scouts
Providence Reds players
Ice hockey people from Edmonton
Stanley Cup champions
Winnipeg Jets (1979–1996) players